Poimenesperus nigrosignatus is a species of beetle in the family Cerambycidae. It was described by Stephan von Breuning in 1947.

References

nigrosignatus
Beetles described in 1947